Yuriy Yermakov (born 3 September 1970) is a Ukrainian gymnast. He competed in seven events at the 1996 Summer Olympics, winning a bronze medal in the men's artistic team all-around event.

References

1970 births
Living people
Ukrainian male artistic gymnasts
Olympic gymnasts of Ukraine
Gymnasts at the 1996 Summer Olympics
Medalists at the 1996 Summer Olympics
Olympic medalists in gymnastics
Olympic bronze medalists for Ukraine
Sportspeople from Donetsk
20th-century Ukrainian people